Miami Bici is a 2020 Romanian comedy film directed by Jesús del Cerro and produced by Matei Dima and Codin Maticiuc. The film tells the story of Ion (Dima) and Ilie (Maticiuc), two Romanian friends who go to Miami, Florida for a high-paid job, unbeknownst to them that they are employed in a drug trafficking business. It became a box office success in Romania being the most watched movie in theaters for three weeks in a row and gaining over $2,500,000.

References

External links 
 

2020 comedy films
2020s Romanian-language films
2020 films
Romanian comedy films
Films set in Miami
Films about the illegal drug trade